Cordy Ryman (born 1971, New York City), an artist based in New York City. Ryman earned his BFA with Honors in Fine Arts and Art Education from The School of Visual Arts in New York in 1997.  He is the son of artist Robert Ryman (1930-2019). Cordy Ryman is represented by Zürcher Gallery, New York, NY.

Works
Ryman’s early works were emotion based figurative sculptures but within his first year at art school he began to experiment with abstract representations.  During his second year at The School of Visual Arts he was working on small scale collages.  This is where Ryman began to develop his current casualist style.
 
Ryman’s artwork is casual in style and fabricated with recycled wood and metal painted and reconstructed with sculptural elements, mimicking the traditional canvas in their display. The materials Ryman uses include wood, gorilla glue, scrap metals, studio sweepings, acrylic and enamel paints and other found objects.  When working with wood, he often keeps the rough jagged edges visible.  This creates a very tactile surface. Ryman alters the surfaces of his artwork to change the appearance but still allows for the character of the materials to be recognized.

He sometimes combines mostly mute colors-white, silver, and creamy oranges- with small touches of bright hues on the edges and seams of his work.  The end result is a fluorescent glow that is reflected onto the gallery spaces and the artwork itself.  In a 2009 interview with Phong Bui in The Brooklyn Rail, Ryman says of his attention to the edges of his paintings: "I guess the main thing about the edges and the sides is that I think about them. In one way or another they are considered. When the sides are painted or accounted for in some way, it makes the piece as a whole seem more like a thing or an independent entity as opposed to a picture of something."

His works range from small to large and often interact with the spaces in which they are presented. When Ryman works on a smaller scale his paintings tend to be saturated with paint transforming the nature of the scrap materials he works with.  The undulating surfaces of these works push the boundary between sculpture and painting.

When Ryman creates work on a larger scale the pieces interact with unique properties of the installation space.   Such pieces are found in the corners of spaces or rising and falling from the walls.  In Ryman’s 2010 solo exhibition at DCKT Contemporary he showed the work Red Brick which consisted of a series of cut and painted wooden “bricks” stacked upon one another in varying shades of red and pink. In this work Ryman questions geometry, order, and the nature of painting itself.

Permanent Collections
Microsoft Art Collection, Redmond, WA
Museum of Contemporary Art, North Miami, FL
Raussmuller Collection, Basel, Switzerland
Rubell Museum, Miami, FL
The Speyer Family Collection, New York, NY
Virginia and Bagley Wright Collection, Seattle, WA

Awards
2006	Helen Foster Barnett Prize, National Academy Museum, New York, NY
1997	Rhodes Family Award for Excellence, School of Visual Arts, New York, NY

Solo exhibitions

ZÜRCHER Gallery, New York, NY
 DODGE Gallery, New York, NY
Connor Contemporary, Washington, DC
DCKT Contemporary, New York, NY
Lora Reynolds Gallery, Austin TX
Kavi Gupta Gallery, Chicago, IL
Mark Moore Gallery, Santa Monica, CA
William Traver Gallery, Seattle, WA

Group exhibitions
Aberrant Abstraction: Keltie Ferris, Chris Martin, Cordy Ryman, Agathe Snow, Nerman Museum of Contemporary Art, Johnson County Community College, Overland Park, KS
Nicole Klagsburn Gallery, New York, NY
One More, Esbjerg Art Museum, Esbjerg, Denmark
Lesley Heller Gallery, New York, NY
American Academy of Arts and Letters, New York, NY
National Academy Museum and School of the Arts, New York, NY
Greater New York 2005, P.S. 1 Contemporary Art Center, Long Island City, NY

References

External links
 Cordy Ryman interviewed by Phong Bui, Dec. 2008
 Cordy Ryman reviewed @ Brooklyn Rail
 Cordy Ryman reviewed by Art in America
 http://www.markmooregallery.com/artists/cordy-ryman/

Artists from New York City
1971 births
Living people
Casualist artists